John Fredrick Parker (1853 – December 12, 1911) was a Captain in the United States Navy and one-time Governor of American Samoa from 1908 to 1910. John F. Parker was born in Ohio in 1853.  He graduated from Annapolis in 1874 and married Elizabeth Scott Lord, niece of President Benjamin Harrison.  He served as governor of Samoa from May 21, 1908 - November 10, 1910.  He was stationed in Manila during the Spanish–American War.  During President Benjamin Harrison's term he served as an aid.  He died of Bright's disease at his home December 12, 1911.

References

1853 births
1911 deaths
United States Naval Academy alumni
Governors of American Samoa
United States Navy officers
Deaths from nephritis
Military personnel from Ohio